ARSC may refer to:

Arctic Region Supercomputing Center
Association for Recorded Sound Collections
Athénée Royal Serge Creuz